Ann J. Lane (1931–2013) was an American educator, historian, and author that was considered to be a pioneer in the fields of women’s history and women’s studies. Before retiring in 2009 she worked at the University of Virginia as a professor of History and director of Women’s Studies.

Lane was born in Brooklyn and attended Brooklyn College, where she graduated with a BA in English in 1952. She went on to receive an MA in sociology from New York University and a PhD in American History from Columbia University.

Bibliography
The Debate over Slavery: Stanley Elkins and His Critics (1971)
The Brownsville Affair: National Crisis and Black Reaction (1971)
To "Herland" and Beyond: The Life and Work of Charlotte Perkins Gilman (1990)

As editor
The Living of Charlotte Perkins Gilman by Charlotte Perkins Gilman (1991)

References

1931 births
2013 deaths
Women's studies academics
University of Virginia faculty
Brooklyn College alumni
New York University alumni
Columbia Graduate School of Arts and Sciences alumni